Louise Minett (born 1975), later known by her married name Louise Richards is a female British sports shooter who won 6 medals whilst representing England at the Commonwealth Games and represented Great Britain at multiple ISSF World Cups, World Shooting Championships and ESC European Shooting Championships.

Career
Representing England at the 1994 Commonwealth Games, she competed in the 10 metres air rifle pairs event, winning the silver medal with Karen Morton. This was the first of six Commonwealth Games medals that she would win between 1994 and 2006.  In Kuala Lumpur 1998 she took the bronze medals in both the 10 metres air rifle singles and the pairs (paired with Becky Spicer). She repeated the same feat (paired with Victoria Eaton) at Manchester 2002.  In 2006, Louise finally collected Gold this time in the 50metre 3 Position Rifle Pairs with Becky Spicer.

During her career, Minett represented Great Britain at four World Shooting Championships with a best finish of 18th. She also represented at 21 ISSF World Cups with four top-10 finishes in addition to a silver AR40 medal at the 1999 Atlanta World Cup. That medal qualified her for the 1999 World Cup Final in Munich where she finished 9th, missing out on a place in the 8-athlete final. She also represented Great Britain at the European Shooting Championships every year between 1994 and 2005, and also in 2007, with multiple finals places.

Domestically, Louise won the British Women's Air Rifle Championship ten times, setting numerous individual and team British records in the process, several of which remained unbroken by 2013 when decimal scoring was adopted for 10m Air Rifle, creating a new generation of records.

Following her retirement from world class shooting, Louise was certified as an ISSF Class-C Rifle Coach and offers professional coaching services to individual shooters and teams.

References

External links

1975 births
Living people
People from Bicester
British female sport shooters
Commonwealth Games gold medallists for England
Commonwealth Games silver medallists for England
Commonwealth Games bronze medallists for England
ISSF rifle shooters
Shooters at the 1994 Commonwealth Games
Shooters at the 1998 Commonwealth Games
Shooters at the 2002 Commonwealth Games
Shooters at the 2006 Commonwealth Games
Commonwealth Games medallists in shooting
Medallists at the 1994 Commonwealth Games
Medallists at the 1998 Commonwealth Games
Medallists at the 2002 Commonwealth Games
Medallists at the 2006 Commonwealth Games